ERQ may refer to:

Ed's Redeeming Qualities, a musical group
Église réformée du Québec, a Christian denomination
Elrose Mine Airport, serving the Eloise Copper Mine in Queensland, Australia (ATA code ERQ)